Abdullah H. Baqui is a public health scientist who demonstrated the effectiveness of simple but effective strategies to reduce preventable newborn deaths.

Biography
Baqui was born and grew up in Gopalganj district in East Pakistan (now Bangladesh). He graduated from Dhaka Medical College in 1976, and completed his Masters studies in Public Health (MPH) and Doctorate in Public Health (DrPH) from Johns Hopkins Bloomberg School of Public Health, Baltimore, USA in 1985 and in 1990 respectively.

Baqui's research confirmed: (a) the use of zinc supplementation during diarrhea to reduce the severity of child mortality. (b) the effectiveness of trained community health workers providing home based health care to reduce neonatal mortality by one-third. and (c) use of Hib vaccination in Bangladesh to reduce the incidence of meningitis and X-ray documented pneumonia in children. Each of these studies has influenced policy decisions. For example, WHO and UNICEF have now recommended the use of zinc as an adjuvant therapy for diarrheal episode. Bangladesh developed a national neonatal health strategy in 2009 that references Baqui's work. More recently a WHO-UNICEF joint statement recommends home visits by trained community health worker as a strategy to improve neonatal survival, based in part on Baqui's research.

Baqui became a professor in the Department of International Health at Johns Hopkins Bloomberg School of Public Health in 2009.

In May 2012, the CORE Group honored Baqui with the Dory Storms Child Survival Recognition Award. Baqui also received a recognition award in 2012 from the Bangladesh Medical Association in North America.

References

Living people
People from Gopalganj District, Bangladesh
Dhaka Medical College alumni
Johns Hopkins Bloomberg School of Public Health alumni
Johns Hopkins Bloomberg School of Public Health faculty
Bangladeshi public health doctors
Bangladeshi emigrants to the United States
Year of birth missing (living people)